Fegley Glacier is a tributary glacier in the Holland Range of Antarctica, flowing east into Lennox-King Glacier,  northeast of Mount Allen Young. It was named by the Advisory Committee on Antarctic Names for Lieutenant Charles E. Fegley, III, of the Civil Engineer Corps, U.S. Navy, officer in charge of the nuclear power unit at McMurdo Station during Operation Deep Freeze, 1964.

References 

Glaciers of the Ross Dependency
Shackleton Coast